Eric William Ryan (6 January 1933 – 2017) was an English professional footballer who played in the Football League for Mansfield Town.

References

1933 births
2017 deaths
English footballers
Association football defenders
English Football League players
Oswestry Town F.C. players
Mansfield Town F.C. players